Richard Phillips may refer to:

Richard Phillips (American painter) (born 1962), artist from the United States
Richard Phillips (athlete) (born 1983), sprinter from Jamaica
Richard Phillips (chemist) (1778–1851), British chemist
Richard Phillips (English painter) (1681–1741), London portrait painter
Richard Phillips (merchant mariner) (born 1955), captain of the MV Maersk Alabama taken hostage by Somali pirates in April 2009
Richard Phillips (MP) (c. 1640–1720), British Member of Parliament for Ipswich
Sir Richard Phillips (publisher) (1767–1840),  British author and publisher, founder of the Monthly Magazine
Richard D. Phillips, American economist
Rich Phillips, American radio personality
Richie Phillips (1940–2013), American executive director
Ricky Phillips (born 1951), American musician

See also 
Richard Philipps (disambiguation)
Richard Phillipps, pen name of Philip K. Dick (1928–1982)